The 2019 Kyrgyzstan Cup was the 28th season of the Kyrgyzstan Cup, the knockout football tournament in Kyrgyzstan. The cup winner qualifies for the 2020 AFC Cup.

The draw of the tournament was held on 13 May 2019.

Preliminary round
The preliminary round was played on 17 May 2019.

Round of 16
The round of 16 was played on 29 May 2019.

Quarter-finals
The quarter-finals were played on 3 July 2019.

Semi-finals
The first legs were played on 11 August 2019, and the second legs were played on 25 September 2019.

Final
The match was played on 27 October 2019.

See also
2019 Kyrgyz Premier League

External links

Kyrgyzstan Cup News
Kyrgyzstan Cup Results

References

Kyrgyzstan Cup seasons
Kyrgyzstan
Kyrgyzstan Cup